Al-Musabbihat are those suras of the Quran that begin with Allah's (Glory be to him) glorification 'Subhana', 'Sabbaha', and 'Yusabbihu'. According to Islamic scholar Muhammad Shafi Deobandi (1897–1976) the collective name of the series Al-Musabbihat refers to the following five or seven Surahs:

 Al-Hadid
 Al-Hashr 
 As-Saff
 Al-Jumua and 
 At-Taghabun
Sometime it also includes:
 Al-Isra
 Al-Ala

Among the seven Surahs, the first three, namely Al-Hadid, Al-Hashr and As-Saff commence with the past perfect tense 'sabbaha' "purity has been proclaimed" whilst the last two, namely Al-Jumu'ah and At-Taghabun commence with the imperfect tense yusabbihu [purity is proclaimed]. This implies that the purity of Allah should be declared at all times, the past, the present and the future.

It is recorded in hadith  that Prophet Muhammad used to recite Al-Musabbihat before he went to sleep and said: "Indeed there is an Ayah in them that is better than one thousand Ayat.". Ibn Kathir commented that this verse referred to is "Huwal awwallu wal aakhiru wazzaahiru wal baatinu wahuwa bi-kulli shai-in aleem." (Al-Hadid 57:3)

References

External links
 Al-Musabbihat

Musabbihat
Quranic exegesis